Enrica Antonioni (Cavi di Lavagna, Italy, 25 February 1952) born Enrica Fico, is an Italian film director and actress, the widow of Michelangelo Antonioni.

Filmography

As herself 
 Time Within Time, documentary (2015)

As director 

 Making a Film for Me is to Live, documentary (1995)
 Con Michelangelo, documentary (2005)

As co-director 

 Noto, Mandorli, Vulcano, Stromboli, Carnevale, documentary (1993)

As actress 
 Identification of a Woman (1982) - Nadia
 Beyond the Clouds (1995)  boutique manager
 Eros (2004) - guest at the restaurant (segment "The Dangerous Thread of Things")

As assistant director 

 China, documentary (1973)
 The Passenger (1975)
 Lo sguardo di Michelangelo,  documentary short (2004)

As executive consultant 

 Beyond the Clouds (1995) 
 Eros (1995), segment The Dangerous Thread of Things

As writer 
 Lo sguardo di Michelangelo, documentary short (2004): collaboration

As composer 
 Eros (1995), segment: "The Dangerous Thread of Things"

As producer 
 Sicilia (1997): documentary short

References

External links

Italian film actresses
Italian film directors
Living people
Italian women film directors
20th-century Italian actresses
People from the Province of Genoa
1952 births